Simone Barontini (born 5 January 1999) is an Italian middle distance runner, who specializes in the 800 metres. He has won seven national titles at the senior level.

Biography
He participated at one edition of the European Athletics Championships in 2018 and one of the European Athletics Indoor Championships in 2019. He finished eighth at the 2019 European U23 Championships.

Achievements

National titles
Barontini won eight national championships at individual senior level.
 Italian Athletics Championships
 800 metres: 2019, 2020, 2021 (3)
 Italian Athletics Indoor Championships
 800 metres: 2017, 2018, 2019, 2020, 2021 (5)

Notes

References

External links
 

1999 births
Living people
Sportspeople from Ancona
Athletics competitors of Fiamme Azzurre
Italian male middle-distance runners
Italian Athletics Championships winners
Athletes (track and field) at the 2022 Mediterranean Games
Mediterranean Games competitors for Italy